The Association of Cricket Officials (ACO) is an organisation set up to represent and support cricket officials, especially umpires and scorers. It operates under the auspices of the England and Wales Cricket Board (ECB) and is often referred to as the "ECB ACO" or similar. Current membership (as of March 2015) is "near 8,000".

Formation
The ACO was formed on 1 January 2008 as a result of members of the Association of Cricket Umpires and Scorers (ACU&S) having voted in favour of their organisation amalgamating with the ECB Officials Association (ECB OA).

When the association was formed, an Interim Board was set up to get the new organisation rolling. Roger Knight was appointed as Chairman of the Interim Board, and has remained the ACO chairman since.

Membership

The association has the following membership categories, with respective subscription rates, as of March 2015:

Full member: £30 direct debit / £32 cheque
Associate member: £15 / £17
Young official or "junior member" (25 & under): £15 / £17
EC member: £30 / £32
Overseas member: £15 / £17

Full, associate and junior memberships are for persons resident in England and Wales; EC membership is for those otherwise living in the European Union (and the Crown dependencies), and overseas membership is for remaining places in the world.

Full, junior and EC members are those who are "active" in officiating in cricket – the association provides appropriate insurance cover as standard to these members (hence the higher subscription fees). Members officiate across the cricket spectrum from village cricket to Test cricket, including women's cricket.

Full and junior members (aged 16 and over) must be certified by the Disclosure and Barring Service if active in England and Wales.

County Associations
For each ECB County Board there is an attached county ACO association. Members of the ACO residing in England and Wales are also a member of one of these county associations, typically the one where they live or are active in.

Counties are then grouped into four regions (Midlands, London & East, South & West, and North), which are used largely as a forum for the county associations and to represent them on the national (England & Wales) ACO Board.

Wales has a single ECB cricket board (called Cricket Wales) and therefore a single ACO association, which is also the (fifth) regional body.

Education programme
A new structure of cricket umpiring and scoring qualifications has now been put into place and the ACO provides training and examinations for these. Separate pathways (through the levels of qualifications) exist for umpires and scorers. Entrants to the pathways do not have to be ACO members, but to progress beyond Level 1 membership is a requirement.

Old umpiring qualifications issued by the ACU&S will be recognised as follows by the ACO:

GL6 – Level 1
GL5 – Level 2

Current courses are as follows:

A new education structure for both umpires and scorers is currently being phased in.

Board
The association's Board as of 2014 consists of:

Chairman: Roger Knight
Special Executive Officer: Nick Cousins
one representative from each of the five regions –
Midlands: Peter Mitchell (Deputy chairman)
London & East: Sid Poole
South & West: Les Clemenson
North: Philip Radcliffe
Wales: Steve Davies
a representative from ICC Europe: Nick Pink
Laws & Universities manager at the MCC: Fraser Stewart
the managing director of ECB Cricket Partnerships: Mike Gatting
ECB umpires' manager: Chris Kelly
first-class umpires representative: Neil Bainton
the chairman of ACCS: Andrew Hignell
an independent member: Janie Frampton

The Board has the following sub-committees:

Education
Member Services
Scorers
Performance & Development
Appointments & Grading

Further notable officers of the association are:

Finance & Project Officer: Ben Francis [Treasurer]
Executive Administrator: Saira Baker [Secretary]

Official merchandise
The famous Worcester-based cricket company Duncan Fearnley manufactures and retails clothing and accessories exclusively for the ECB ACO.

Offices
The association is registered at the ECB's head offices at Lord's Cricket Ground (Marylebone, Middlesex), but most administrative activity occurs at the ECB's offices at Edgbaston Cricket Ground (Birmingham, Warwickshire).

See also

Cricket in England
Cricket in Wales
Association of Cricket Umpires and Scorers

External links
ECB – Association of Cricket Officials official website

References

Cricket umpiring
Scoring (cricket)
Cricket umpiring associations
Cricket administration in England
Cricket administration in Wales
Organisations based in Birmingham, West Midlands
2008 establishments in the United Kingdom

Sports organizations established in 2008